Overnight Success may refer to:
 "Overnight Success" (song), a 1989 song by George Strait
 Overnight Success (Neil Sedaka album), 1975
 Overnight Success (Dave Dobbyn album), 1999
 "Overnight Success" (The Loud House), a 2016 Nickelodeon episode